The Nicobar imperial pigeon (Ducula nicobarica) is a species of bird in the family Columbidae. It is endemic to the Nicobar Islands. Its natural habitats are subtropical or tropical moist lowland forests and subtropical or tropical mangrove forests.

This species was formerly treated as subspecies of the green imperial pigeon (Ducula aenea). It is now considered as a separate species based on the big differences in both plumage and vocalization compared to all other green imperial pigeon subspecies.

References

Ducula